The Southampton-class frigates launched from 1820 onwards were 52-gun sailing frigates of the fourth rate produced for the Royal Navy following the close of the Napoleonic War. They were designed in 1816 to carry sixty guns, but were completed with fifty-two guns only. The design, a joint effort by the Surveyors of the Navy, was modified from that of the Java launched in 1815.

A total of four ships were ordered on 23 May 1816, with two more in 1817 and 1818; however the last pair were delayed and were not launched until 1843 with a substantially altered armament. Two further ships were ordered to a very slightly enlarged version of this design in 1825, to have been built at Plymouth Dockyard as Liverpool and Jamaica, but were cancelled on 5 March 1829 without ever being laid down.

Ships in class 
 Southampton
 Ordered: 23 May 1816
 Built by:  Deptford Dockyard.
 Keel laid:  March 1817
 Launched:  7 November 1820
 Completed:  11 May 1821.
 Fate:  Became a Coastguard vessel in 1857 and a training ship in 1867. Sold to break up on 26 June 1912.
 Portland
 Ordered: 23 May 1816
 Built by:  Plymouth Dockyard.
 Keel laid: August 1817
 Launched:  8 May 1822
 Completed:  20 August 1833.
 Fate:  Sold to break up on 19 May 1862.
 Lancaster
 Ordered: 23 May 1816
 Built by:  Plymouth Dockyard.
 Keel laid:  18 July 1818
 Launched:  23 August 1823
 Completed:  8 October 1823.
 Fate:  Never commissioned; fitted out to become a fever hospital ship but was never used. Sold to break up at Plymouth on 17 February 1864.
 Winchester
 Ordered: 23 May 1816
 Built by: Woolwich Dockyard.
 Keel laid:  November 1818
 Launched:  21 June 1822
 Completed:  16 September 1822.
 Fate:  Became training ship Conway at Liverpool in November 1861, renamed Mount Edgcumbe on 1 September 1876. Sold to break up on 8 April 1921.
 Chichester
 Ordered: 23 July 1817
 Built by: Woolwich Dockyard.
 Keel laid:  July 1827
 Launched:  12 July 1843
 Completed:  23 February 1844.
 Fate:  Became training ship at Greenhithe in 1866. Sold to break up in May 1889.
 Worcester
 Ordered: 21 July 1818
 Built by: Deptford Dockyard.
 Keel laid:  December 1820
 Launched:  10 October 1843
 Completed:  November 1843 at Sheerness Dockyard.
 Fate:  Became training ship at Greenhithe in 1862. Sold to break up in August 1885.

References 

 David Lyon, The Sailing Navy List, Conway Maritime Press, London 1993. .
 David Lyon and Rif Winfield, The Sail and Steam Navy List, Chatham Publishing, London 2004. .

Frigate classes
Ship classes of the Royal Navy